This is a list of snakes found in the U.S. state of Oklahoma.

Snakes of Oklahoma

Non-venomous snakes
Arizona elegans—glossy snake
Carphophis amaenus—worm snake
Cemophora coccinea—scarlet snake
Coluber constrictor—Southern Black Racer
Diadophis punctatus—ring-neck snake
Elaphe guttata—great plains rat snake
E. obsoleta—black rat snake
Farancia abacura—mud snake
Heterodon nasicus—western hognose snake
H. platyrhinos—eastern hognose snake
Hypsiglena torquata—Texas night snake
Lampropeltis calligaster—prairie kingsnake
L. getulus—speckled and desert kingsnakes
L. triangulum—milk snake
Leptotyphlops dulcis—blind snake
Liodytes rigida — glossy water snake
Masticophis flagellum—coachwhip snake
Nerodia erythrogaster—yellow-bellied and blotched water snake
N. fasciata—broad-banded water snake
N. rhombifera—diamond-back water snake
N. sipedon—northern and midland water snake
Opheodrys aestivus—keeled green or rough green snake
Pituophis catenifer sayi—bullsnake
Regina grahami—Graham's water snake
Rhinocheilus lecontei—long-nosed snake
Sonora semiannulata—great plains ground snake
Storeria dekayi—brown snake
S. d. texana-Texas brown snake
S. occipitomaculata—red bellied snake
Tantilla gracilis—flat-headed snake
T. nigriceps—black-headed snake
Thamnophis cyrtopsis—black-necked garter snake
T. elegans—wandering garter snake
T. marcianus—checkered garter snake
T. proximus—western ribbon snake
T. radix—plains garter snake
T. sirtalis—red-sided and Texas garter snakes
Tropidoclonion lineatum—lined snake
Virginia striatula—rough earth snake
V. valeriae—smooth earth snake

Venomous snakes
Agkistrodon contortrix—copperhead
A. piscivorus—cottonmouth or water moccasin
Crotalus atrox—western diamond-back rattlesnake
C. horridus—timber rattlesnake
C. viridis—prairie rattlesnake
Sistrurus catenatus—western massasauga rattlesnake
S. miliarius—western pygmy rattlesnake

Lists of snakes of the United States